The ECAC men's basketball tournaments are postseason college basketball tournaments organized by the Eastern College Athletic Conference (ECAC).

Despite its name, the ECAC is not a traditional athletic conference, but rather a loosely organized sports federation for colleges and universities in the northeastern United States. Among other things, it organizes end-of-season college basketball tournaments for member schools which are not members of a traditional conference, or which do not otherwise have access to such a tournament. At various times, it has organized end-of-season basketball tournaments at the National Collegiate Athletic Association (NCAA) Division I, Division II, and Division III levels.

Division I
From 1975 to 1982, the ECAC organized annual regional end-of-season men's basketball tournaments for independent Division I ECAC member colleges and universities in the Northeastern United States. The winner of each regional tournament was declared the ECAC regional champion for the season and received an automatic bid in the NCAA Division I men's basketball tournament.

Before 1975, the ECAC had not organized such tournaments for Division I schools; the NCAA tournament invited only one team per Division I conference and accommodated independents with a limited number of at-large bids. In 1975, however, the NCAA tournament's field expanded to 32 teams, including the champions of end-of-season conference tournaments, who received automatic bids. Although a number of at-large bids still existed, the process for selecting the field for the 1975 NCAA tournament included many second-place conference teams and threatened to exclude independent schools in the northeastern United States, which had no end-of-season conference tournament to play in and therefore no automatic bids. With no conventional athletic conferences yet in existence in the Northeast, the ECAC began to organize its Division I basketball tournaments in 1975, allowing Northeastern independents to retain their independent status while still having an opportunity to play in an end-of-season tournament offering an automatic bid. The ECAC Division I tournaments thus assured that at least some Northeastern colleges and universities would receive NCAA tournament bids.

In both 1975 and 1976, the ECAC organized four regional Division I tournaments: Metro (for the New York City area, New Jersey, and Connecticut); New England; South (for Pennsylvania, Maryland, Virginia, West Virginia, and Washington, D.C.); and Upstate (for Upstate New York). As Eastern independent colleges and universities began to join existing conferences or form new ones and play in their own end-of-season conference tournaments, the number of ECAC regional tournaments declined due to reduced demand for them. After the formation of the Eastern Collegiate Basketball League (which later became the Atlantic 10 Conference), the ECAC combined its Southern and Upstate Regions into a single "Southern" (later "Upstate-Southern" and "South-Upstate") Region and held only three regional tournaments in 1977, 1978, and 1979. After the teams that played in the New England region all joined the Big East Conference, the Atlantic 10 Conference, or the new ECAC North Conference (which later became the America East Conference), the ECAC also did away with its New England tournament, and in 1980 and 1981 it held only two tournaments, Metro and Southern. Many of the teams in the Metro Region then formed the Metro Atlantic Athletic Conference (MAAC), and in 1982 the ECAC held two tournaments, reorganized as the Metro-South (composed of former Metro Region teams which had not joined the MAAC) and South tournaments.

After the completion of the 1982 post-season, the remaining ECAC Metro-South Region teams formed the ECAC-Metro Conference (which later became the Northeast Conference), while the ECAC South Region teams formed the ECAC South Conference (which later became the Colonial Athletic Association). With all the former independents in the northeastern United States having joined a traditional conference holding its own end-of-season tournament, and with the National Invitation Tournament providing a means of postseason tournament play for Division I teams not invited to the NCAA tournament, the ECAC had no reason to continue its Division I basketball tournament series, and it ceased to organize such tournaments after 1982.

1975 tournaments
National rankings indicated.

Regional champions
Sources

Brackets
Sources
Metro

New England

Southern

Upstate

1976 tournaments
National rankings indicated.Sources

Regional champions

Brackets
Metro

New England

Southern

Upstate

1977 tournaments
National rankings indicated.

Regional champions
Sources

Brackets
Source
Metro

Note: The Manhattan-St. Johns semifinal game was held at Rose Hill Gymnasium, Bronx, NY. The Army-Seton Hall semifinal game took place at Yanitelli Center, Jersey City, NJ.

New England

The 1977 New England Tournaments semifinal games contrasted with one another greatly: Holy Cross, led by freshman guard Ronnie Perry, played a hard, physical game – with 45 free throws in the second half, 24 by Holy Cross and 21 by Connecticut – to defeat Connecticut 89-77, while Providence, led by senior guard Joe Hassett, found its offense lacking and used tough defensive play to overcome Fairfield 44-31. The much-anticipated championship game that followed – a rematch of the December 1976 Colonial Classic final played at the Boston Garden, in which Holy Cross had handed Providence one of only three losses the Friars suffered all season on a game-winning last-second shot by the Crusaders Chris Potter – was played before a sold-out crowd at the Hartford Civic Center and was one of the greatest games in the eight-season history of the ECAC Division I tournaments. With less than a minute to play and his team behind, Holy Crosss Michael Vicens stole the ball along his own end line and raced down the court to score on a reverse dunk. This energized both the crowd and the Holy Cross players and swung the games momentum in favor of Holy Cross. The Crusaders got the ball with less than 10 seconds to go, and Potter scored on an 18-foot (5.5-meter) jumper with five seconds remaining to again give Holy Cross a win, 68-67. Holy Cross thus won an automatic bid to the 1977 NCAA Division I men's basketball tournament and made its first appearance in that tournament since 1956. Providence also reached the NCAA tournament via an at-large bid.

Southern

Note: The St. Bonaventure-Syracuse semifinal game was held at Manley Field House, Syracuse, NY. The Old Dominion-Georgetown semifinal game took place at McDonough Gymnasium, Washington, DC.

1978 tournaments
National rankings indicated.

Regional champions
Sources

Brackets

Metro

New England

Upstate-Southern

Note: The St. Bonaventure-Syracuse semifinal game was held at the Rochester Community War Memorial, Rochester, NY. The Virginia Commonwealth-Georgetown game took place at McDonough Gymnasium, Washington, DC.

1979 tournaments
National rankings indicated.

Regional champions
Source

Brackets
Sources
Metro

New England

South-Upstate

1980 tournaments

Regional champions
Source

Brackets
Sources
Metro

South

1981 tournaments

Regional champions
Source

Brackets
Sources
Metro

South

1982 tournaments

Regional champions
Source

Brackets
Source
Metro-South

South

Divisions II and III

Combined Division II/III tournaments
The ECAC organized combined Division II/Division III men's basketball tournaments annually from 1973 to 1980 as invitational events for ECAC teams not invited to the NCAA Men's Division II basketball tournament or – after it began in 1975 – the NCAA Men's Division III basketball tournament. From 1973 through 1975 and from 1977 through 1980, it held four regional tournaments – Metro (for the New York City area and New Jersey), New England, Southern (for schools south of New York and New Jersey), and Upstate (for Upstate New York) – each year, while in 1976 it held only three tournaments (Metro, New England, and Upstate).

After 1980, the ECAC divided the Division II and Division III competitions, placing the Division II competitions on hiatus until 1988 and beginning Division III-only tournaments in 1981.

Division II tournaments
After 1980, the ECAC placed Division II end-of-season tournament competition on hiatus until 1988. From 1988 through 2005 it organized a single annual Division II men's basketball tournament as an invitational event for Division II ECAC teams not invited to that years NCAA Men's Division II basketball tournament. No tournament took place in 2006, but the ECAC held it twice more, in 2007 and 2008. The Division II tournament again went on hiatus from 2009 through 2013, thanks to various factors including an expansion of the NCAA Men's Division II Tournament field and a decline in the number of Division II men's basketball programs associated with the ECAC. A Division II tournament took place in 2014, but the tournament again went on hiatus after that.

Division III tournaments
After its last combined Division II/III regional tournaments in 1980, the ECAC split Division II and Division III tournament competition. In 1981, it held its first Division III-only postseason regional invitational men's basketball tournaments for ECAC teams not invited to the NCAA Men's Division III basketball tournament, and these have occurred annually ever since. The ECAC organized these tournaments regionally, holding Metro (for the New York City area and New Jersey), New England, and Upstate (for Upstate New York) tournaments from 1981 to 1985 and adding a Southern tournament (for schools south of New York and New Jersey) in 1986. In 2013, the ECAC returned to a three-tournament structure, holding Metro, New England, and Southern regional tournaments, while in 2014 it had four tournaments (Metro, New England, Southeast, and Southwest). In 2015 and 2016, it again had a three-tournament structure, with New England, Metro, and South tournaments. In 2017, it changed format again, becoming a single tournament which determined a single ECAC Division III champion. No tournament took place in 2021 because of the COVID-19 pandemic, but the tournament resumed in 2022..

References

Annual sporting events in the United States
History of college basketball in the United States
Postseason college basketball competitions in the United States
NCAA Division I men's basketball conference competitions
Recurring sporting events established in 1973
Eastern College Athletic Conference